Scoparia fimbriata is a species of moth in the family Crambidae. This species is endemic to New Zealand.

Taxonomy
It was described by Alfred Philpott in 1917. However the placement of this species within the genus Scoparia is in doubt. As a result, this species has also been referred to as Scoparia (s.l.) fimbriata.

Description

The wingspan is about 20 mm. The forewings are pale ochreous-brown, but darker basally. The first line is whitish, margined posteriorly with blackish-brown. The second line is pale, margined anteriorly with blackish-brown. The hindwings are ochreous-grey. The lunule and subterminal line are fuscous. Adults have been recorded on wing in December and January.

References

Moths described in 1917
Moths of New Zealand
Scorparia
Endemic fauna of New Zealand
Endemic moths of New Zealand